Aberporth is a seaside village, community and electoral ward in Ceredigion, Wales. The population at the 2001 Census, was 2,485, of whom 49 per cent could speak the Welsh language. At the 2011 Census, the population of the community was 2,374 and of the village 1241. Aberporth's beaches have earned Blue Flag status.

Location

Etymology 

The name Aberporth is first recorded in 1284, and is derived from the Old Welsh “aber” (mouth) and “porth” (port).

History

In the 16th century, boats, nets and salt for preserving were brought in from Ireland. Aberporth became a subsidiary port of Cardigan. The landing point developed rapidly in the late 17th and early 18th centuries as local people began to take part in the maritime trade. It became a very active port; the northern of the two beaches extended into the river valley and provided a safe anchorage. Lime kilns, coal yards and warehouses were built on its south shore.

Aberporth developed into a centre of the herring fishing industry in Wales. Drifting and netting were both employed, and at one time at least 20 full-time herring smacks, a type of traditional fishing boat, went to sea regularly. The industry continued until the beginning of the First World War, when fish stocks declined.

Governance
Aberporth is the name of the electoral ward which is coterminous with the community, although before 1995 it was a ward of Dyfed County Council and included the neighbouring communities of Penbryn and Y Ferwig. Since 1995, the ward has elected one county councillor to Ceredigion County Council. Independent councillor Gethin James represented the ward from 2004 until the May 2017 election when he was beaten by Plaid Cymru candidate Gethin Davies.

Aberporth is represented at the local level by 12 community councillors on Aberporth Community Council.

Amenities
The small St Cynwyl's Anglican parish church was renovated in 1857, but has been decaying over the last few decades.

The village has two sandy beaches: Traeth y Dyffryn ("valley beach"), also known as Traeth y Llongau ("ships beach"), and Traeth Dolwen Both have been awarded a Blue Flag several years running. Aberporth is a recreational fishing village in the summer and is also used by divers and boating people. Crab and lobster fishing continues on a small scale.

In 2006 orcas and harbour porpoises were seen, but such sightings are rare. Even rarer was a turtle seen in 2005. Sunfish and basking sharks are sometimes seen offshore in the summer.  Bottle nose dolphins are a common sight offshore, by the MoD site from April each year.

Apart from tourism, the main local employer is the Ministry of Defence at the Qinetiq missile range. ParcAberporth technology park hosts organisations involved in the sectors of defence, aerospace and the technology of UAVs known as drones. ParcAberporth is linked with the research facilities at Aberystwyth University. Aberporth Airport  is being developed as West Wales Airport for domestic flights, and as a centre for the deployment of civil and military drones.

Education
Aberporth School, established in 1834, had 31 pupils in 1836. In 1854, a building for 110 pupils was built; average attendance in 1904 was 68. It was a national school providing elementary education, in accordance with the teaching of the Church of England, to the children of the poor. In 1926, it became a Church of England school.

In 1915, a council school was established.

Ysgol Gymunedol Aberporth is the present-day primary school in Aberporth. There were 122 pupils on the roll in 2013. Only 12 per cent came from homes where Welsh was the main language (down from 16 per cent in 2007). It was in the A/B category according to the Local Education Authority's language policy in 2001, but by 2007, it had changed into a category A school, meaning that Welsh is now the main language of teaching there.

Notable people
The Village is notable for producing four Welsh Rugby internationals and one British and Irish Lion:
Ricky Evans (born 1960), Welsh rugby union international, was born in Aberporth.
Wayne Proctor (born 1972), Welsh rugby union international, raised in Aberporth.
Paul Ringer (born 1948), Welsh rugby union international, raised in Aberporth.
Brynmor Williams (born 1951), Welsh rugby union international and British and Irish Lion, was raised in Aberporth.

Weather station
The Met Office has a weather station at Aberporth. It is one of the 22 coastal locations whose reports are included in the BBC Shipping Forecast. Data goes back to 1941.

Typically, less than three days of the year reach  or above, the warmest of which will on average be . The highest temperature recorded at Aberporth was  during July 2006.

Rainfall averages some 931 mm a year, with at least 1 mm falling on 151/152 days.

References

External links

www.geograph.co.uk : photos of Aberporth and surrounding area
Information on the Ceredigion Tourism website
History of sounding rocket launches from Aberporth facility 1959-1972

Coast of Ceredigion
Communities in Ceredigion
Villages in Ceredigion
Wards of Ceredigion
Wards of Dyfed